Digitech Studio School is the first studio school in the wider Bristol area. It opened in 2015 and moved to a new building in Warmley, Gloucestershire in 2016. It is part of the Cabot Learning Federation.

It takes students from 14 to 19 years old.

In 2021 Ofsted rated the school as "Good".

References

External links 
 

Kingswood, South Gloucestershire
Secondary schools in South Gloucestershire District
Educational institutions established in 2015
Studio schools
2015 establishments in England